Malar (மலர்) is an 2023 Indian Tamil-language television series, starring Preethi Sharma, Agni and Nivisha in the lead roles. It was premiered on 27 February 2023 airing on Sun TV from Monday to Saturday at 15:00 and is also available on the digital platform Sun NXT.

Plot
The story of a two sisters Malar (Preethi Sharma) and Parvathy (Nivisha), but not siblings by birth, Parvathi means the world to her warm-hearted sister Malar. While Malar's ultimate wish is to find the perfect life partner and a happily-ever-after life for Paravathi, what is destiny's plan for them?

Cast

Main
 Preethi Sharma as Malar
 Agni as Arjun
 Nivisha as Parvathi

Supporting
 Niharika Harshu as Sembagavalli
 Varun Udhay as
 Akhila Prakash as Durga
 Srilekha Rajendran as Lakshmi
 Dev Anand Sharma as Anand
 Bavithran as Siva
 Rajesh Kanna
 Meenatchi
 D.S.R Seenivasan
 Indiran
 Kalaivel
 Raj
 Bala
 Usha Elizabeth Suraj

Production

Development
On end 2022, Sun Network confirmed through a press release that it would distribute new Tamil serial, to be produced by Vision Time. Initially, the title of the serial was named Shakti. Later renamed as Vanmathi. After some reasons the first promo was released in the name of as Malar on 15 February 2023.

Casting
Preethi Sharma was cast in the female lead role as Malar. This marks Preethi Sharma's return to Tamil television after a small hiatus. Nivisha was cast Malar's elder sister. Indiran and Agni plays the male lead alongside her. Niharika Harshu was cast as Negative role.

Release
The first promo was released on 15 February 2023 featuring Preethi Sharma, Nivisha and Srilekha Rajendran. The second promo was unveiled on 20 February 2023, featuring protagonist Preethi Sharma and Niharika Harshu and revealing the release date.

The show started airing on Sun TV on 27 February 2023 From Monday to Saturday at 15:00 (IST), replacing Abhiyum Naanum Time slot.

References

External links
 Malar at Sun NXT

Sun TV original programming
Tamil-language melodrama television series
Tamil-language romance television series
2023 Tamil-language television series debuts
Television shows set in Tamil Nadu
Tamil-language television soap operas